Sphenomorphus maindroni  is a species of lizard in the family Scincidae. The species was originally described by Sauvage in 1879. According to the Catalogue of Life, the species Sphenomorphus maindroni does not have known subspecies.

The size of this specie is small, and the snout–vent length is between 24 and 59 mm; tail varies from nearly oval to square in cross-section.

Etymology
The specific name, maindroni, is in honor of French naturalist Maurice Maindron.

Geographic range
S. maindroni is found in the Admiralty Islands, New Britain, and New Guinea.

Reproduction
S. maindroni is oviparous.

References

Further reading
Sauvage HE (1879). "Notice sur quelques reptiles nouveaux ou peu connus de la Nouvelle-Guinée ". Bulletin de la Société Philomathique de Paris 7 (3): 47–61. (Lygosoma maindroni, new species, pp. 55–56). (in French).

maindroni
Reptiles described in 1879
Taxa named by Henri Émile Sauvage
Skinks of New Guinea